Brownville is an unincorporated community located in the towns of Colburn and Delmar, in Chippewa County, Wisconsin, United States.

Notes

Unincorporated communities in Chippewa County, Wisconsin
Unincorporated communities in Wisconsin